Up Close & Personal with PZ is an Indian celebrity-based chat show hosted by Preity Zinta and produced by Red Chillies Idiot Box and broadcast on UTV Stars, a newly launched channel by UTV. The show featured 10 of Zinta's favourite male colleagues. The first season wrapped up after completing 11 episodes in a span of three months. The first episode of the show aired on 3 September 2011 with Salman Khan as guest. It ended with Anil Kapoor as guest.

Overview 
The show has Bollywood celebrities having a one-on-one conversation with the actress/host. Set up at Preity’s very own penthouse that is decorated all pink by the actress, the show promises to reveal all things personal about the stars. The show also does its bit for the society where the stars and the host pose for a poster that will later be auctioned. The money garnered is donated to the NGO of the guest's choice. To make the show even more entertaining, Preity had also added some impromptu elements, like the guests need to enact a scene on a given situation.

Episode list

References 

Indian television talk shows
2011 Indian television series debuts
2011 Indian television series endings
Red Chillies Idiot Box